ABC Spark is a Canadian English-language discretionary specialty channel owned by Corus Entertainment. The channel was launched on March 26, 2012, replacing the declining channel Dusk.

ABC Spark is based on the U.S. subscription channel Freeform (previously known as ABC Family) and primarily consists of programming aimed at teenagers, young adults/millennials, and preteens, as well as some sitcoms. The channel's name and various programs are licensed from the ABC Family Worldwide subsidiary of Walt Disney Television, a subsidiary of The Walt Disney Company.

History

Announcement and launch (2011–2012) 
The announcement of the formation of ABC Spark occurred on October 26, 2011, as part of a program licensing agreement between Corus Entertainment and The Walt Disney Company. The use of the name "ABC Spark", as opposed to "ABC Family", is presumably to avoid any confusion with Family Channel (owned by Astral Media at the time), which at the time aired programming from ABC Family's sibling, Disney Channel. The channel's broadcast licence, tentatively known then as Harmony, was approved by the Canadian Radio-television and Telecommunications Commission (CRTC) in February 2012.

Selected ABC Family programs that were set to air on ABC Spark began airing in special sneak preview blocks in advance of the network's launch starting on January 26, 2012, on fellow Corus channels YTV, W Network, and CMT, as they and remaining Corus-owned channels broadcast commercials about the channel. The channel was owned by Corus (51%) and Shaw Media (49%) at launch on March 26, 2012.

Transfer of ABC Spark licence; Corus' acquisition of Shaw Media's ownership interest (2013) 
Shortly after the channel's launch, the CRTC published notice of a pending application to transfer the ABC Spark licence to the numbered company which previously owned Dusk, which is 51% owned by Corus and 49% owned by Shaw Media. However, on March 4, 2013, Corus Entertainment announced that it would acquire Shaw Media's 49% ownership interest in ABC Spark, in a larger transaction that would see Corus also acquire Shaw's 50% interest in Historia and SériesPlus, while Corus would sell their 22.58% stake in Food Network. In total, Shaw would receive net proceeds of approximately $95 million in cash. The sale of the portion of ABC Spark closed in April 2013.

Expanded relationship with Disney; first original series (2015–2016) 
In April 2015, Corus Entertainment announced that it would expand its relationship with Disney, and Corus acquired the rights to Disney Channel's programming and related brands, which resulted in the launch of a Canadian version of Disney Channel, and re-launched versions of Disney Junior and Disney XD after DHX Media decided against renewing their agreement to broadcast the programs in Disney's programming catalogue.

In October 2015, ABC Family announced plans to change its name to "Freeform" in January 2016. ABC Spark did not adopt the Freeform name, but it did adopt the on-air imaging used by the U.S. network.

By the end of October 2015, ABC Spark had its first original series entitled Cheer Squad, a docu-reality series which first premiered on July 5, 2016.

Programming

ABC Spark carries most of the original programs produced for Freeform in the U.S. (Pretty Little Liars: The Perfectionists premieres on W Network), including its own versions of the 31 Nights of Halloween and 25 Days of Christmas events, which broadcast special programming during the lead-up to their respective holidays. The channel's daily programming mainly consists of acquired sitcoms and dramas, as well as syndicated programs from other Corus-owned channels.

References

External links

Corus Entertainment networks
Freeform (TV channel)
English-language television stations in Canada
Television channels and stations established in 2012
2012 establishments in Canada
Digital cable television networks in Canada